The Exciting Wilson Pickett, released in 1966, was the third album by R&B and soul singer Wilson Pickett. The album charted at #3 on the U.S. Billboard R&B albums chart and #21 on the popular albums chart, becoming the highest-charting studio album of Pickett's career. The making of the album saw Pickett end his relationship with Stax Studios in Memphis, Tennessee, where he had cut his early singles, and move to Fame Studios in Muscle Shoals, Alabama, where he would record for the next two years. According to AllMusic, this album firmly established Picket's "stature as a major '60s soul man". The album launched four major hits for Pickett, but AllMusic emphasizes that the album cuts, "of nearly an equal level", will be of more interest to collectors.

Originally released on the Atlantic label, the album has been re-issued on CD by  Rhino, Collectables and Warner Bros. Records. In 2007, a new LP edition was released by the label 4 Men with Beards.

Hit singles
The Exciting Wilson Pickett launched four crossover hit singles. "In the Midnight Hour" reached #1 on the Billboard R&B singles chart and #21 on the pop singles chart. "Land of a Thousand Dances" reached #1 and #6 respectively, his biggest pop hit. "Ninety-nine and a Half (Won't Do)" reached #13 and #53. "634-5789 (Soulsville, U.S.A.)", a song which Pickett had not on first hearing liked, reached #1 and #13.

Pickett later redid the song "Land of a Thousand Dances", originally a hit in 1963 for New Orleans-based composer Chris Kenner, for the soundtrack of The Great Outdoors, a 1988 film starring Dan Aykroyd and John Candy.

Track listing
"Land of 1000 Dances" (Chris Kenner) – 2:28
"Something You Got" (Kenner) – 2:58
"634-5789 (Soulsville, U.S.A.)" (Steve Cropper, Eddie Floyd) – 3:00
"Barefootin'" (Robert Parker) – 2:22
"Mercy Mercy" (Don Covay, Ronald Dean Miller) – 2:30
"You're So Fine" (Lance Finney, Willie Schofield, Robert West) – 2:38
"In the Midnight Hour" (Cropper, Wilson Pickett) – 2:36
"Ninety-nine and a Half (Won't Do)" (Cropper, Floyd, Pickett) – 2:44
"Danger Zone" (Cropper, Pickett) – 2:12
"I'm Drifting" (Homer Banks, Pickett, David Porter) – 2:54  
"It's All Over" (Cropper, Pickett) – 2:21
"She's So Good to Me" (Bobby Womack) – 2:17

Tracks 1,2,4-6,12 recorded May 9-11, 1966 in Muscle Shoals
Track 7 recorded May 12, 1965 in Memphis
Tracks 9,11 recorded September 16, 1965 in Memphis
Tracks 3,8,10 recorded December 20, 1965 in Memphis

Personnel
Wilson Pickett – vocals
Albert "Junior" Lowe (tracks 1,2,4-6,12), Donald Dunn (tracks 3,7-11) – bass guitar
Steve Cropper (tracks 3,7-11), Jimmy Johnson (tracks 1,2,4-6,12), Chips Moman (tracks 1,2,4-6,12) Tommy Cogbill (tracks 1,2,4-6,12) – guitar
Isaac Hayes (tracks 3,8-11), Spooner Oldham (tracks 1,2,4-6,12), Joe Hall (track 7) – piano
Roger Hawkins (tracks 1,2,4-6,12), Al Jackson Jr. (tracks 3,7-11) – drums
Wayne Jackson, Gene "Bowlegs" Miller (tracks 9,11) – trumpet
Charles "Packy" Axton (tracks 3,7-11), Andrew Love, Charles Chalmers (tracks 1,2,4-6,12) – tenor saxophone
Floyd Newman – baritone saxophone
John Peck - unknown

Production
Haig Adishian – cover design
Steve Cropper – supervisor
Tom Dowd – engineer, supervisor
A. Scott Galloway – liner notes
Rick Hall – engineer, supervisor
Dan Hersch – digital remastering
Bill Inglot – digital remastering
John Peck
Bob Rolontz – liner notes
Nick Samardge – front cover photography
Jim Stewart – engineer, supervisor
Jerry Wexler – supervisor

References

Wilson Pickett albums
1966 albums
Albums produced by Jerry Wexler
Albums produced by Steve Cropper
Albums produced by Tom Dowd
Albums produced by Jim Stewart (record producer)
Atlantic Records albums